Jaroslav Olesnitsky (Ярослав Іванович Олесницький) (born: 1875, Halych, Ivano-Frankivsk Oblast - died July 15, 1933, Zolochiv, Lviv oblast) – is a Ukrainian diplomat, politic, lawyer. Head of the Ukrainian mission to the United Kingdom (1920-1921).

Career 
In October 1918 - he was a delegate to the Ukrainian Lviv National Council proclaimed the establishment of the West Ukrainian People's Republic in November 1918.

22 January 1919 - he became an adviser of the Western Ukrainian People's Republic foreign affairs secretariat and was a member of the Western Ukrainian delegation in Kyiv to the proclamation of the union of the Western Ukrainian People's Republic with the Ukrainian People's Republic.

28 January 1919 - he appointed First Counsellor of the diplomatic mission of the Ukrainian People's Republic which began work in London in May 1919.

From September 1919 to January 1920 - he acted as temporary head of the Ukrainian mission in London.

In August 1920 to 1921 - he became head of the Ukrainian mission to the United Kingdom.

From 1921 - he returned to Lviv.

In 1921-1922 - he lectured at the Lviv University.

From 1923 - he practised as a lawyer in Zolochiv.

From 1930 - he represented the Ukrainian National Democratic Alliance to the Sejm of the Polish Republic.

External links
 Jaroslav Olesnitsky
 Ukrainians in the United Kingdom Online encyclopaedia
 Kto był kim w Drugiej Rzeczypospolitej (redakcja naukowa Jacek M.Majchrowski przy współpracy Grzegorza Mazura i Kamila Stepana), Warszawa 1994, wyd. BGW,  s. 382-383  biogram opracował Czesław Brzoza;
 Biogram Oleśnicki Jarosław, Ołesnyćkyj Jarosław w bazie danych Sejmu RP

1875 births
1933 deaths
People from Halych
People from the Kingdom of Galicia and Lodomeria
Diplomats from Lviv
Ambassadors of Ukraine to the United Kingdom
Ukrainian National Democratic Alliance politicians
Lawyers from Lviv
Ukrainian Austro-Hungarians
Austro-Hungarian lawyers
Ukrainian nationalists
West Ukrainian People's Republic people
Members of the Sejm of the Second Polish Republic (1930–1935)